Rosenblattichthys alatus, the winged pearleye, is a species of fish found in the in tropical waters of the Indo-Pacific.

Size

References

Aulopiformes
Taxa named by Pierre Fourmanoir
Fish described in 1970